Viorel Mateianu (1 June 1938 – 25 November 1997) was a Romanian football player and coach.

Club career
Mateianu was born in Lipănești, Prahova and started playing football in the Romanian lower leagues at Flacăra Boldești and Progresul CPCS București. He made his Divizia A debut on 25 August 1957, playing for Progresul București in a 3–2 victory in which he scored a goal against Energia Petroșani, shortly after his debut, Mateianu was nicknamed "Little Alfredo Di Stéfano". In 1957, during a football tournament held in San Sebastián, Spain in which he participated with one of Romania's youth teams, Mateianu had an offer to play for Real Madrid, which he refused, not wanting to risk to never see his parents again, as he could have not been allowed to return to the country by the communist regime. In 1958 he went to play for three seasons and a half at Știința Cluj, where he scored 21 goals in 72 Divizia A appearances, a period in which he also graduated the Faculty of Law. Then he went at Steaua București where he won the 1961–62 Cupa României, opening the score in the 5–1 victory from the final against Rapid București. He returned to Progresul București where he spent 8 seasons, after which he was allowed by the communist authorities to play in Western Europe, going in West Germany at TUS Wannsee Berlin and Alemannia Aachen where he ended his playing career. Mateianu has a total of 220 matches played and 62 goals scored in 
Divizia A.

International career
Viorel Mateianu played six games and scored two goals at international level for Romania, making his debut under coach Augustin Botescu at the 1960 European Nations' Cup quarter-finals where they were defeated by Czechoslovakia, who advanced to the final tournament. He played three games and scored two goals at the 1966 World Cup qualifiers, making his last appearance for the national team in a friendly which ended with a 2–0 loss against East Germany.

International goals
Scores and results list Romania's goal tally first, score column indicates score after each Mateianu goal.

Coaching career

In 1973, just a few months after returning from Germany where he graduated a coaching course, Mateianu was given the role of head coach at his former club, Progresul București, then playing in Divizia B, managing to promote the team back to Divizia A in the 1975–76 season, being dismissed in the beginning of the following season.

He went to coach Divizia B team Baia Mare in 1976 and with a team he formed mostly with local players from Maramureș County, Mateianu managed to earn a promotion in Divizia A, where the team finished twice on the 4th position. During his period spent at Baia Mare, Mateianu became known for his coaching innovations, having many tactical schemes which he gave them names like Morișca ("The Hand-Mill") in which the strikers and midfielders swap places during the game, being considered an early form of tiki-taka, Momeala mare ("The Big bait"), Momeala mică ("The Little bait"), Căciula ("The Hat"), Paralelogramul ("The Parallelogram"), Americana ("The American"), Fundul de sac ("The bottom of the bag") or Șarpele ("The Snake") are only a few examples. He also believed that the best football practice for the footballers was to play football, that is why while the rest of the clubs used to organize long cantonments before the games and training sessions in the mountains during the preparation period from the season brakes, he used to put his team to play many friendly games. Mircea Lucescu was very impressed by Mateianu's working methods, coming to study his training sessions, sometimes asking Mateianu to extend his training sessions so he can see more of his methods, also he went to his home where they would talk all night about football and draw tactical game schemes together.

However, after he left Baia Mare his career went on a downfall having an unsuccessful second spell at Progresul București, two spells at Divizia B team, Dacia Unirea Brăila which he failed on both occasions to promote to the first league, a modest 12th place in the 1982–83 Divizia A season with Petrolul Ploiești and a relegation to Divizia B with Jiul Petroșani.

His last spell as a coach was in 1988 at Bihor Oradea where in September he had a controversial match against Steaua București which the club officials asked him to lose, but he refused and after Bihor had a 2–1 advantage at half-time, Steaua managed to score two goals in the second half, winning the game with 3–2 but the second goal was scored in extra time, being believed that the referee prolonged the game intentionally with 6 minutes which was very uncommon in those times in order to help them score. In November 1988, Mateianu suffered a stroke after which he retired from coaching, many people believing that the stress caused by the game with Steaua was the cause of it, but his wife, Mihaela dismissed that idea claiming that Mateianu had previously suffered a minor stroke in 1983. He suffered another stroke in 1994 after which he was unable to move, staying in home until his death took place on 25 November 1997. On 25 September 2009 he received post-mortem the Honorary Citizen of Baia Mare title, also the town's stadium is named after him. Viorel Mateianu has a total of 176 matches as a manager in the Romanian top-division, Divizia A consisting of 70 victories, 25 draws and 81 losses.

Honours

Player
Progresul București
Divizia B: 1965–66, 1969–70
Steaua București
Cupa României: 1961–62

Manager
Progresul București
Divizia B: 1975–76
Baia Mare
Divizia B: 1977–78

Notes

References

External links

1938 births
1997 deaths
People from Prahova County
Liga I players
Liga II players
FC Progresul București players
FC Steaua București players
Romanian footballers
Romania international footballers
Romanian expatriate footballers
Romanian football managers
FC Universitatea Cluj players
Alemannia Aachen players
FC Progresul București managers
CS Minaur Baia Mare (football) managers
FC Petrolul Ploiești managers
CSM Jiul Petroșani managers
FC Bihor Oradea managers
Association football forwards